Love Must Be Understood is a 1933 German musical comedy film directed by Hans Steinhoff and starring Rosy Barsony, Georg Alexander, and Wolf Albach-Retty. It was shot at the Babelsberg Studios in Berlin. The film's sets were designed by the art director Benno von Arent.

Cast

References

Bibliography
 Jacobsen, Wolfgang. Babelsberg: ein Filmstudio 1912-1992. Argon, 1992.

External links

Films of Nazi Germany
Films directed by Hans Steinhoff
German musical comedy films
1933 musical comedy films
Films set in Dresden
German black-and-white films
1930s German films
Films shot at Babelsberg Studios
UFA GmbH films